, also known by his stage name Raul (ラウール), is a Japanese singer, actor, model, and TV personality. Raul is a member of idol group Snow Man under Johnny & Associates.

Biography
Raul joined Johnny & Associates in May 2015. In June 2018, he was chosen to be a member of Chibiko Ninja (later known as Shounen Ninja), a new pre-debut unit under Johnny's Jr., a branch of Johnny & Associates that manages trainees and their activities.

On January 17, 2019, Raul was added as a new member to Snow Man, an existing Johnny's Jr. unit, in addition to Koji Mukai and Ren Meguro. Snow Man made their official debut on January 22, 2020. Corresponding to his debut, Raul withdrew from Shounen Ninja.

In 2021, Raul co-starred with Ai Yoshikawa for the live action film adaptation of the manga series "Honey Lemon Soda" in his first leading role outside of Snow Man related projects.

In June 2022, Raul debuted at Paris Fashion Week for the Yohji Yamamoto POUR HOMME Spring/Summer 2023 Collection.

Personal life
Raul is of Venezuelan and Japanese descent. In April 2022, it was revealed that Raul had graduated from high school and enrolled at Waseda University in the Department of Health Sciences and Social Welfare.

Filmography

TV dramas

Films

References

External links
 

2003 births
Living people
Japanese singers